Mes Sarcheshmeh Stadium is a multi-purpose stadium in Sarcheshmeh, Kerman, Iran. It is currently used mostly for football matches. The stadium was built in 2010 and has a capacity of 15,000 people. Mes Sarcheshmeh F.C. play their games at the stadium.

References

Football venues in Iran
Multi-purpose stadiums in Iran
Buildings and structures in Kerman Province
Sport in Kerman Province